The NYU Catherine B. Reynolds Program for Social Entrepreneurship is a program designed to attract, encourage and train a new generation of leaders in public service. The Reynolds Program currently funds 16 undergraduate students and 20 graduate students from eleven different schools at NYU, all of whom receive funding, training and support to help them realize their visions for solving society's most intractable problems. The only program of its kind in the US, the Reynolds Program attracted 1000 applicants last year for 8 graduate fellowships.

References

External links 
 Homepage for NYU Catherine B. Reynolds Program for Social Entrepreneurship

New York University